The Altmann was an automobile made by Kraftfahrzeug-Werke GmbH, Brandenburg/Havel from 1905 to 1907. It was one of only a handful of German steam car makes, and was quite advanced for the era. Its valve timing engine allowed it to follow the Gardner-Serpollet principle, though the engine differed from that design in other aspects. Its three cylinders allowed it to produce . The death of its designer, Adolf Altmann, prevented it from being built on a large scale. The firm later went on to build electric cars.

References
 Hans-Otto Neubauer, "Altmann", in G.N. Georgano, ed., The Complete Encyclopedia of Motorcars 1885-1968  (New York: E.P. Dutton and Co., 1974), pp. 38.

Defunct motor vehicle manufacturers of Germany
Steam cars